The 1984–85 season was the 105th season of competitive football by Rangers.

Overview
Rangers played a total of 49 competitive matches during the 1984–85 season.

The season was Wallace's first full season in charge since his return. The team continued the strong form they had ended the previous season in, and by Christmas were in third place, in touching distance of the top of the table. However, a defeat to rivals Celtic on New Year's Day saw the club's form completely implode, and they only won four more league games all season. Rangers again finished fourth in the league by a massive twenty-one point record behind champions Aberdeen. This disappointment was not caused due to a lack of investment in the playing squad. A total of £495,000 was spent bringing in Iain Ferguson and Cammy Fraser from Dundee, Ted McMinn from Queen of the South and bringing back Derek Johnstone from Chelsea.

The club won the Scottish League Cup (Skol Cup) for he second season in a row defeating Dundee United in the final. A solitary Iain Ferguson strike gave Rangers a 1–0 win.

Results
All results are written with Rangers' score first.

Scottish Premier Division

UEFA Cup

Scottish Cup

League Cup

Glasgow Cup

Appearances

League table

See also
 1984–85 in Scottish football
 1984–85 Scottish Cup
 1984–85 Scottish League Cup
 1984–85 UEFA Cup

References 

Rangers F.C. seasons
Rangers